The Secretary of Natural and Environmental Resources of Puerto Rico is responsible for protecting, conserving, and managing the natural and environmental resources of Puerto Rico.

Daniel Galán Kercadó was the Secretary of Natural and Environmental Resources of Puerto Rico under governor Luis Fortuño. At least by 2013 he was no longer Secretary of the DNRA (the Spanish language acronym for the Department) and was acting as environmental manager for Intuitive Consulting, a company contracted by the builders of the new Macy's store in Plaza del Caribe in Ponce, Puerto Rico.

In 2017 Governor Ricardo Rosselló designated Tania Vazquez Rivera as Secretary of the DRNA.

Secretaries 
 1986–1988: Justo A. Méndez Rodriguez
 1993–1996: Pedro A. Gelabert
 2009–2013: Daniel J. Galán Kercado
 2013–2016: Carmen R. Guerrero Pérez
 2016: Nelson J. Santiago Marrero
 2017–2019: Tania Vázquez Rivera

References

External links
  

Council of Secretaries of Puerto Rico
 
Department of Natural and Environmental Resources of Puerto Rico
Puerto Rico
Forestry in Puerto Rico